Ted Lawson (born 1970) is an American contemporary artist.

Work
Critic Christian Viveros-Fauné, in describing Lawson's recent labyrinth sculptures, said: "The similarities between circuit boards and computer engineering diagrams, among other blueprints for knowledge, take new form in Lawson's mazes, dovetailing neatly with murky yet popular metaphors for information exchange: data clouds, neural nets, global webs, and other numinous and hyper-connective metaphors. With these analogues in mind, Lawson has developed algorithms to shape and carve his wall-mounted mazes. The fact that he ultimately cedes authorship to the CNC machine to manufacture each object underscores a crucial point. All systems of knowledge, his work suggests, contain dead ends and cul-de-sacs, especially once these have been fundamentally instrumentalized. As the media-studies guru Marshall McLuhan put it twenty-six years before the internet: 'When you give people too much information, they resort to pattern recognition.'" Dystopian Geometries: The Art of Ted Lawson

In 2011, he started a large-scale sculpture commissioned by Napster and Facebook founder Sean Parker. The piece was finished and installed in Parker's home in 2014.

Lawson owns Prototype New York, an art fabrication studio, which has created works for Ghada Amer, Mariko Mori, Jeff Koons, Terence Koh and Yoko Ono.

Ghost In The Machine
In 2014, Lawson began working on a series of drawings using his own blood fed into a modified CNC machine. The initial drawing, a life size self-portrait called Ghost In The Machine, went viral after a video of the process was picked up and shared by Huffington Post, Juxtapoz Magazine, and many more.

According to the Huffington Post:

Ceci N'est Pas Un Viol
In 2015 Lawson directed Ceci N'est Pas Un Viol, a video conceived by performance artist Emma Sulkowicz. The work explores the boundaries between consensual and non-consensual sex.

Exhibitions

2013
 Crude, Emmanuel Fremin Gallery, NYC

2012
 Entropy, Emmanuel Fremin Gallery, NYC

References

Bibliography
 Liz Stinson, "This Artist Had a Robot Print His Selfie With Ink Made From His Blood", Wired Magazine, 2014
 Chris Plante, "Human paints nude self-portrait with own blood and a humorless robot", Verge Magazine, 2014
 Priscilla Frank, "And Here Is The Selfie Made Out Of Blood You've (Maybe) Been Waiting For (NSFW)", Huffington Post, 2014

External links
 artist's official site
 artist's Vimeo page
 Prototype NY's website
 NYTimes article

Living people
American sculptors
American contemporary artists
1970 births